"Shine" is the third single from Australian singer-songwriter Vanessa Amorosi's debut album, The Power (2000). After its release on 15 May 2000, the ballad debuted and peaked at number four on the Australian Singles Chart and earned a platinum disc from the Australian Recording Industry Association. On 29 January 2001, it was released in Europe, reaching the top 50 in Austria, Germany, and Switzerland. "Shine" won an APRA Award in 2001 for Most Performed Australian Work.

"Shine" was adopted by Ansett Airlines for their final advertising campaign before the company went bankrupt and had to shut down. "I jinxed them with my song!" Amorosi said. "That was heartbreaking, actually. We had some little goodbye parties and stuff. It was horrible". Mark Holden covered the song in 2004 for his Live at the George Ballroom DVD/EP.

Background
The original lyrics to "Shine" were much darker. Mark Holden was responsible for the success of her song "Shine", which Amorosi wrote for a friend from high school who committed suicide. Amorosi says:"Mark changed a line in it. He said the song didn't work, or that one particular line in it didn't work. The line went 'Everyone you see, everyone you know is gonna die' and he didn't like the word 'die'. He thought it was just wrong. We were all sitting around trying to find a substitute, and we were all stuck on the word 'try'. But Mark came up with the idea of changing it to 'shine' and it all came together. That's Mark's magic. He has a great ear for music. He knows exactly what makes a hit.

I think it was a good outcome, because something that was tragic became positive, but... I could never go back to changing it to 'die' now. It is what it is. A lot of my music on The Power was very personal, because I suppose that's what sets me apart from the other songwriters. I'm very blunt and honest with melodies and lyrics. I like to get straight to the point. So I think with "Shine" I tried to make it uplifting but it was very, very personal - and quite an upsetting song."

Live performances
Amorosi sang "Shine" at the Opening Ceremony of the Paralympic Games 2000, which was broadcast in 80 countries. She also performed "Shine" at the 2002 Commonwealth Games closing ceremony in Manchester.

Track listings

Australian CD single
 "Shine" (radio version) – 3:52
 "Shine" (extended radio version) – 5:06
 "Shine" (R&B version) – 3:56
 "Shine" (extended R&B version) – 5:30
 "Shine" (unplugged version) – 3:36
 "Steam" – 3:47

European CD single
 "Shine" (extended mix radio edit) – 3:56
 "Shine" – 3:52
 "Shine" (Tung N Groov remix) – 3:59
 "Absolutely Everybody" (Sydney 2000 version) – 6:23

Charts

Weekly chart

Year-end charts

Certifications

Release history

References

2000s ballads
2000 singles
2000 songs
APRA Award winners
Mark Holden songs
Songs about suicide
Songs written by Mark Holden
Songs written by Vanessa Amorosi
Universal Music Group singles
Vanessa Amorosi songs